The School of Civil and Environmental Engineering is one of seven schools in the University of the Witwatersrand's Faculty of Engineering and the Built Environment. The School offers 4-year undergraduate degrees and post-graduate degrees in civil engineering.

The School offers undergraduate and post-graduate degrees in civil engineering.

Undergraduate degrees
 Bachelor of Science (Civil Engineering)

Postgraduate degrees and graduate diplomas
 Graduate Diploma  – Graduate Diploma in Engineering
 MSc  – Master of Science
 PhD

References

Engineering and the Built Environment